Santanina Tillah Rasul (born Santanina Centi Tillah, September 14, 1930) is a Filipina politician and the first Muslim woman member of the Senate of the Philippines.

Education
In 1952, Rasul earned a BA in Political Science cum laude from the University of the Philippines, Diliman, in Quezon City. She also obtained a master's degree in National Security Administration from the National Defense College of the Philippines. In 1978, Rasul earned doctoral credits in public administration from the University of the Philippines' College of Public Administration.

Political career
Rasul, together with Senator Leticia Ramos-Shahani, was one of the first women senators in Congress reestablished during the Fifth Republic. Her first experience in government and public service, however, was as a public school teacher in Siasi and Jolo from 1952 to 1957. From 1963 to 1964, she became technical assistant to the Office of the President of the Philippines. She has been an advocate of adult literacy and peace-building for years through her affiliations to various non-government organizations.

The political career of Rasul started when she became a barrio councilor of Moore Avenue, Jolo for two consecutive terms; from 1960 to 1961 and from 1962 to 1963. From 1971 to 1976, she was a provincial board member of the Provincial Board of Sulu. She also served as a Commissioner for Muslim and other ethnic minorities from 1978 to 1987 while being affiliated with the Ministry of Education, Culture, and Sports (renamed the Department of Education, Culture, and Sports during the administration of President Corazon Aquino) as a member of its board.

Senate tenure
Rasul was elected senator and served for two consecutive terms; from 1987 to 1992 and from 1992 to 1995. As a senator for eight years, Rasul authored, co-authored, and/or sponsored important legislation concerning women's rights, Muslim affairs, family, and gender equality.

An important legislation that she co-authored with Senator Raul Roco was Republic Act No. 7192 or the Women in Development and Nation-Building Act of 1995. The Act outlawed discrimination against women, opened the doors of the Philippine Military Academy to women, and mandated that a substantial portion of government funds at all levels be used for programs that would benefit and develop women's capabilities. She also sponsored Republic Act No. 6949, the law declaring March 8 of every year as National Women's Day in the Philippines. Rasul was also the chairperson of such important Senate committees as Civil Service and Government Recognition, and Women and Family Relations.

Rasul was recognized by the Senate and the Women and Gender Institute of Miriam College for her dedication to her legislative duties and for her tireless effort to pursue gender equality, improve Philippine society, and promote and uphold democracy. She was also designated as Honorary Ambassador of UNESCO during the International Literacy Year in 1990.

Personal life
She was married to former Philippine Ambassador to Saudi Arabia Abraham A. Rasul (1922 - 2002), with whom she has six children. Rasul can play the gambang.

References

External links
Santanina Rasul's page on Senate's website

1930 births
Living people
20th-century Filipino educators
Filipino Muslims
Filipino schoolteachers
Lakas–CMD (1991) politicians
People from Sulu
Senators of the 8th Congress of the Philippines
Senators of the 9th Congress of the Philippines
University of the Philippines Diliman alumni
Women members of the Senate of the Philippines